Adelsberg may refer to:

Adelsberg, the German name for Postojna, a town in Inner Carniola, Slovenia
Adelsberg (Gemünden am Main), a settlement in Main-Spessart, Bavaria, Germany
Adelsberg (hill), a mountain of Saxony, Germany